Mikhail Leonidovich Slonimsky (– 8 October 1972) was a Soviet writer, member of the Serapion Brothers group.

Mikhail was born in Saint Petersburg to the family of Intelligentsia. His grandfather, father and aunt were professional writers. His uncle Semyon Vengerov was a famous philologist and literary critic. His older brother Nicolas Slonimsky became a famous composer.

In January 1915 after graduating from his gymnasium Mikhail went as a volunteer to Russian Army to fight in World War I. He was awarded St. George medal, was wounded, returned to the front, wounded again and evacuated to the Petrograd (Saint Petersburg) hospital.
Since 1917 Mikhail published his works regularly (his first publication was in the magazine New Satiricon of 1914). He was one of the founders of the Serapion Brothers group. The group met at his apartment and according to some memorises, he was the inventor of the name.

Later Mikhail developed into a typical Soviet writer and an administrator of the Union of Soviet Writers.

He died in Leningrad in 1972.

Mikhail's son, Sergei Slonimsky is a notable Russian composer.

References

External links
 Works of Mikhail Slonimsky 
 Biography

Soviet writers
1897 births
1972 deaths
Jews from the Russian Empire
Russian Jews
Writers from Saint Petersburg
Soviet people of Polish-Jewish descent
Soviet Jews